Harmston railway station was a station in Harmston, Lincolnshire. It saw services to Nottingham, Lincoln and further afield. It closed in 1962 but the line remained open until 1965.

References

Disused railway stations in Lincolnshire
Former Great Northern Railway stations
Railway stations in Great Britain opened in 1867
Railway stations in Great Britain closed in 1962